Featherston House is located in Ivanhoe, Victoria. It was designed by leading Australian architect Robin Boyd of Romberg & Boyd in 1967. The house was completed in 1969.

House design

The Featherston House is designed like an artist studio, and combines inspiration from a warehouse and loft. The house is famed for the design of its interior. Its interior comprises an indoor garden, combined with the suspension of four ‘floating’ platforms above the garden. The architect introduces natural light into the space by the construction of a transparent roof and large full glassed windows on one side of the house. The concept was to relook at how spaces could unfold and prevent compartmentalisation of the spaces.

Boyd's home design was built for the couple Mary and Grant Featherston, who were industrial designers and a flat that was meant for the Featherston's parents. Boyd's works raised awareness for Australia's domestic buildings and suburbs in the 1960s and shows intentions of experimentation with ideas of affordable housing, raising the bar for aesthetics in suburbia housing for the general people.

His works are often seen as representational of International Modern Movement in Australia. Robin was an architect, teacher and writer and was well known in his field as an architect who pushes ideas and boundaries creatively.

The Featherston House sits on sloping ground, at the edge of a parkland in the suburbs. 
The Featherston's, owners of the house, were open to new ideas and Boyd had the creative freedom to design an alternative scheme, with the theme of living in a garden. The design approach was considered radical at that time with full glassed windows, overlooking the bush land, its garden at the ground floor and platforms that are placed strategically from the chimney, placed in the centre. The Featherston house took on the idea of a beautiful tree house. The owner describes her bedroom— “with its dizzying outlook from the highest of the four platforms — as a "nest.

The house brings in spaces from the outdoors and ‘responses’ to the natural environment. There is multi usage of a single space since the raised platform is used as a dancing area at parties. The raised platform also allows cool air in summer. The main exposition of this idea is a large 7.5m high space at the centre of the house. The idea of de compartmentalising is further developed by suspension of different living spaces on a series of four staggered, unframed platforms, forming the living, dining, study and master bedroom spaces.

In 1953, Boyd successfully achieved the vision of the combination of window and wall and launched The Stegbar 'Windowall' that year. The firm of Stegbar had been founded in Melbourne in 1946 by Brian Stegley (1920–1974) ('Steg-') and George Barrow ('-bar') with the intention of manufacturing clock cases and office furniture. In 1950 Stegbar made timber windows from their factory on the corner of Bay and Aberdeen Roads in Sandringham.  Robin Boyd designed the Stegbar 'Windowall' system which revolutionised the firm's economic base. The overall appearance of the Stegbar 'Windowall' was light but the frames made of hardwood were resilient enough to hold any roof load.
Individual framing members were continuous in both directions – unbroken mullions and transoms - intersecting each other in a copyright halved joint, alike a floor to ceiling window.

The roof is translucent cellular polycarbonate, allowing soft light to pass through and light up  the space below at all times of the day. This is the third roof solution to be tried and the most successful. A wall of glass at the south elevation of the house lets additional light in and also provides views to the treed parkland beyond. The eastern wall hides the kitchen, family and guest bedrooms, located in their own zone, with the flat above. Meanwhile, the other service areas are placed behind the western wall. Some of the more interesting features of the Featherston House are Boyd's preference of Japanese design, incorporating natural air conditioning, adapted to the Australian weather. The design includes three flaps built into the platform which can be utilised to draw air from a “cool room" to ventilate the house.

Award 
 RAIA Gold Medal 1969

References

External links

Houses in Melbourne
Buildings and structures in the City of Banyule
1969 establishments in Australia
Houses completed in 1969